This is a list of fighter aces in World War II from Poland.

A

B

C

D

F

G

H 
Herbst, Witold Aleksander

I

J

K

L

M

N

P

R

S

T

U

W

Z

Key to Awards Abbreviations

See also
Bajan's list

Notes

References

Poland
World War II aces